The 1992 Edmonton Eskimos finished in 2nd place in the West Division with a 10–8 record. The club attempted to win their 11th Grey Cup championship, but lost the West Final to the eventual Grey Cup champion Calgary Stampeders.

Offseason

CFL Draft

Schedule 
# Date Visitor Score Home OT Attendance A June 25 Calgary Stampeders 22–8 Edmonton Eskimos 36,553 B June 30 Edmonton Eskimos 27–20 BC Lions

Regular season

Season Standings 
West Division Team GP W L T PF PA Pts Calgary Stampeders 18 15 3 0 646 418 30 Edmonton Eskimos 18 10 8 0 507 372 20 Saskatchewan Roughriders 18 11 7 0 511 495 22 BC Lions 18 10 8 0 574 583 20 Sacramento Gold Miners 18 6 12 0 498 509 12

Season schedule 
Week Date Visitor Score Home OT Attendance Record Pts 1 July 10 Toronto Argonauts 8–38 Edmonton Eskimos 26,336 1–0–0 2 2 July 15 Edmonton Eskimos 22–23 Saskatchewan Roughriders 17,566 1–1–0 2 3 July 21 Saskatchewan Roughriders 3–35 Edmonton Eskimos 27,894 2–1–0 4 4 July 31 Edmonton Eskimos 43–11 Sacramento Gold Miners 17,827 3–1–0 6 5 Aug 7 BC Lions 39–23 Edmonton Eskimos 25,236 3–2–0 6 6 Aug 13 Edmonton Eskimos 11–53 Winnipeg Blue Bombers 25,786 3–3–0 6 7 Aug 18 Edmonton Eskimos 45–14 Toronto Argonauts 20,563 4–3–0 8 8 Aug 25 Hamilton Tiger-Cats 8–46 Edmonton Eskimos 24,356 5–3–0 10 9 Sept 2 Sacramento Gold Miners 12–13 Edmonton Eskimos 37,042 6–3–0 12 9 Sept 6 Edmonton Eskimos 13–33 Calgary Stampeders 38,205 6–4–0 12 10 Sept 10 Calgary Stampeders 16–29 Edmonton Eskimos 54,324 7–4–0 14 11 Sept 17 Edmonton Eskimos 10–34 Hamilton Tiger-Cats 17,102 7–5–0 14 12 Sept 26 Winnipeg Blue Bombers 52–14 Edmonton Eskimos 30,972 7–6–0 14 13 Oct 2 Edmonton Eskimos 34–13 Sacramento Gold Miners 15,914 8–6–0 16 14 Bye 8–6–0 16 15 Oct 16 Ottawa Rough Riders 1–19 Edmonton Eskimos 25,140 9–6–0 18 16 Oct 22 Edmonton Eskimos 19–17 Ottawa Rough Riders 19,580 10–6–0 20 17 Oct 29 Edmonton Eskimos 54–14 BC Lions 35,674 11–6–0 22 18 Nov 7 Calgary Stampeders 21–39 Edmonton Eskimos 23,536 12–6–0 24

Total attendance: 274,836

Average attendance: 30,537 (50.8%)

Playoffs 
Week Date Visitor Score Home OT Attendance Division Semi-Final Nov 5 Saskatchewan Roughriders 13–51 Edmonton Eskimos 26,397 Division Final Nov 12 Edmonton Eskimos 29–15 Calgary Stampeders 20,218 Grey Cup Nov 19 Winnipeg Blue Bombers 23–33 Edmonton Eskimos 50,035

References

Edmonton Elks seasons
1992 in Canadian football